Venturin is both a surname and a given name. Notable people with the name include:

 Giorgio Venturin (born 1968), Italian footballer
 Venturin Thrauison (fl. late 1500s), Slovenian politician

See also
 Venturi (surname)
 Venturini, surname